Dethiosulfovibrio peptidovorans is an anaerobic, slightly halophilic, thiosulfate-reducing bacterium. Its genome has been sequenced. It is vibrio-shaped (3-5 by 1 µm), gram-negative and possesses lateral flagella. It is non-spore-forming. Its type strain is SEBR 4207T.

References

Further reading
Staley, James T., et al. "Bergey's manual of systematic bacteriology, vol. 3. "Williams and Wilkins, Baltimore, MD (1989): 2250–2251.

External links
LPSN

Type strain of Dethiosulfovibrio peptidovorans at BacDive -  the Bacterial Diversity Metadatabase

Synergistota
Bacteria described in 1997